Yasemen Saylar (born 7 September 1990) is a Turkish former professional basketball player.

Honors
Turkish Women's Basketball League
Runners-up (2): 2007-08, 2009–10
Turkish Cup
Winners (1): 2009-10
Turkish Presidents Cup
Winners (1): 2007-08
EuroCup Women
Winners (1): 2008-09
FIBA SuperCup
Runners-up (1): 2009

External links
Profile at galatasaray.org
Profile at tbl.org.tr
Player Profile at Eurobasket Women 2009

1990 births
Living people
Galatasaray S.K. (women's basketball) players
Point guards
Basketball players from Istanbul
Turkish women's basketball players